Judge Wilkinson may refer to:

J. Harvie Wilkinson III (born 1944), judge of the United States Court of Appeals for the Fourth Circuit
Joseph Biddle Wilkinson Jr. (1845–1915), member of the Board of General Appraisers, predecessor to the United States Court of International Trade

See also
Nick Browne-Wilkinson, Baron Browne-Wilkinson (1930–2018), justice of the High Court of Justice of England